Thirumalisai Alwar or Thirumazhisai Aazhwar is a Tamil language film starring M. M. Dandapani Desigar. The film was released on 20 August 1948.

Plot 
Thirumazhisai is a sacred town near Chennai and the film narrates its mythological tale about a venerated sage being seduced by a temptress sent by Lord Indra. She becomes pregnant. The foetus is removed from her womb and thrown into the bushes. It is saved by the Lord and becomes a male child who later blossoms into the Aazhvaar!

Cast 

Male cast
M. M. Dandapani Desikar
Vidwan Srinivasan
P. B. Rangachari
S. V. Subbaiah
R. Balasubramaniam
T. S. Durairaj
D. V. Narayanaswami

Male cast (Contd.)
M. R. Swaminathan
K. K. Perumal
Master Padmanabhan
T. K. Kalyanam
A. K. Srinivasan
K. R. Rajagopalan
M. S. Raghavan

Female cast
Trichur Premavathi
M. S. Devasena
P. K. Saraswathi
P. S. Sivabhagyam
K. S. Angamuthu
C. R. Lakshmi Devi
K. K. Radha

Production 
During the 1940s, two friends, M. Chakravarthi Iyengar of the famous business family of old Madras city, MD Brothers, and a successful automobile spare parts dealer C. Kannabiran Pillai, joined hands to produce this movie based on the life of Thirumazhisai Aazhvaar
and

Soundtrack 
The music was composed by S. V. Venkatraman. Lyrics by Papanasam Sivan, S.D.S.Yogi and T.K. Sundara Vathiyar.

Trivia 
Remembered for the music of Dhandapani Desikar and the religious tale associated with the Aazhvaar

References

External links 
 

1948 films
1940s Tamil-language films
Films scored by S. V. Venkatraman
Indian black-and-white films